Aina Berg (7 January 1902 – 7 October 1992) was a Swedish freestyle swimmer who won bronze medals in the 4 × 100 m freestyle relay at the 1920 and 1924 Summer Olympics. In 1920 she also competed in the individual 100 m and 300 m events, but failed to reach the finals. Berg was the national 100 m champion in 1921–1926 and held a national record between 1921 and 1932.

References

External links 
 
 
 

1902 births
1992 deaths
Olympic swimmers of Sweden
Swimmers at the 1920 Summer Olympics
Swimmers at the 1924 Summer Olympics
Olympic bronze medalists for Sweden
Swimmers from Gothenburg
Olympic bronze medalists in swimming
Swedish female freestyle swimmers
SK Najaden swimmers
Medalists at the 1924 Summer Olympics
Medalists at the 1920 Summer Olympics
Women's World Games medalists
20th-century Swedish women